Trpimir II was King of Croatia from 928 to 935. He was from the Trpimirović dynasty. Trpimir was probably the son of Duke Muncimir and younger brother of King Tomislav.

Following the death of Simeon I of Bulgaria, Byzantium no longer needed Croatia's military support and repealed its alliance. Previously, Byzantium relied heavily on the Croats to threaten Simeon from the west. Despite the achievements of King Tomislav in halting Bulgaria's expansion, Byzantium reversed Croatia's supremacy over the Theme of Dalmatia, which fell once again under its administration. However, Byzantine administration was nominal. 

Trpimir's woes did not stop there. Pope Leo VI abolished the Diocese of Nin in 928 and transferred Bishop Grgur to Skradin, in what was seen as a humiliating defeat for pro-Slavic proponents in the long running dispute between the Split and Nin Bishoprics.

Croatia did not expand under the rule of Trpimir.

De Administrando Imperio mentions that in the time of Trpimir, Croatia had a significant merchant fleet that traded across the entire Adriatic Sea.

He was the father of Krešimir I.

See also 
 List of rulers of Croatia

References

Further reading 
 
 

Kings of Croatia
Trpimirović dynasty
10th-century Croatian monarchs
Roman Catholic monarchs
935 deaths
Year of birth unknown